Williams v Commonwealth of Australia [2014] HCA 23 (also known as Williams (No 2)) judgment of the High Court. It is related to executive prerogative and spending in relation to the Australian Government's National School Chaplaincy Programme.

Background
Following the decision in Williams v Commonwealth (Williams (No 1)), the Commonwealth enacted the Financial Framework Legislation Amendment Act (No 3) in an attempt to validate the National School Chaplaincy Programme and other similar Commonwealth spending programs.

Mr Williams brought new proceedings in the High Court challenging the validity the legislation's provisions and regulations, in particular, s 32B of the Financial Management and Accountability Act 1997 (Cth) (FMA Act), Part 5AA and Schedule 1AA of the Financial Management and Accountability Regulations 1997 (FMA Regulations) and item 9 of Schedule 1 to the Financial Framework Legislation Amendment Act (No 3) 2012 (the Financial Framework Amendment Act).

Judgment
The High Court unanimously upheld Mr William's challenge that the relevant provisions of the Financial Framework Legislation Amendment Act were invalid as they extended beyond the scope of Parliament's power under the Constitution.

The High Court rejected arguments by the Commonwealth that the provisions were valid as laws incidental to the powers to spend and to enter into contracts, finding that the laws needed to be grounded in a separate head of legislative power.

References

High Court of Australia cases
2014 in case law
2014 in Australian law
Law about religion in Australia